The Pavuna River is a river of Rio de Janeiro state in southeastern Brazil.

See also
List of rivers of Rio de Janeiro
List of rivers of South America

References
Brazilian Ministry of Transport

Rivers of Rio de Janeiro (state)